Kokhono Megh is a 1968 Bengali mystery romance movie directed by Agradoot.  It stars Uttam Kumar and Anjana Bhowmik in lead roles.

Story
While on vacation, art teacher Seema Rai met a charming stranger named Narayan Chowdhury. This pair builds friendship. When he returned home, he found that his apartment had been vandalized and that he had been told that his stray uncle had been killed. He knew little about Kaka but he knew he was involved in diamond smuggling. The smuggler, whom he had once divided, began to follow the boundaries, believing that he had hidden part of the diamond. Narayan Chowdhury comes to town and Seema finds solace in his company. But can he be trusted or does he have a bad motive?

Cast

 Uttam Kumar
 Anjana Bhowmik
 Kali Banerjee
 Shiven Banerjee
 Robin Banerjee
 Ardhendu Bhattacharya
 Shakti Bhattacharya
 Amar Biswas
 Beena Biswas
 Indulekha Chatterjee
 Raja Chatterjee
 Subrata Chatterjee
 Balai Das
 Bimal Das
 Kalpana Das
 Nilima Das
 Sudhir Das
 Arindam Gangopadhyay

Soundtrack

References

External links
 

1968 films
1960s Bengali-language films
Bengali-language Indian films
Films scored by Sudhin Dasgupta